The Piñera family is a Chilean family which gained political influence in the late 20th century.

Prominent members
Sebastián Piñera, President of Chile (2010-2014, 2018-2021)
José Piñera, economist, brother of Sebastián
Miguel Piñera, musician, brother of Sebastián
Pablo Piñera, brother of Sebastián
Bernardino Piñera, Catholic bishop, uncle of Sebastián
Andrés Chadwick, senator, cousin of Sebastián
Herman Chadwick, brother of Andrés
María Teresa Chadwick, sister of Andrés
Cecilia Morel, First Lady (2010-2014), wife of Sebastián
José Antonio Viera-Gallo, Socialist politician, husband of María Teresa

Ancestry

References